Ulrik Christian Gyldenløve, Count of Samsø (1678 – December 1719) was a Dano-Norwegian Admiral in the Royal Danish-Norwegian Navy and Governor of Iceland. He was an acknowledged illegitimate son of King Christian V of Denmark and his officially acknowledged royal mistress Sophie Amalie Moth.

Life
When Gyldenløve was 6 years old, his father appointed him Governor of Iceland, then a Danish possession, a position that he held until his death, although he never visited the country.

Although Frederick IV of Denmark strongly distrusted nobility, his half-brother, Ulrik Christian Gyldenløve became Lieutenant General Admiral of the Danish Fleet in 1697, ultimately going on to become Commander-in-Chief of the Navy. He is also recognized as the founder of the Royal Danish Naval Academy.

By the outbreak of the Great Northern War General-Admiral Gyldenløve and the fleet were ready for the confrontation, but to no avail. The allied fleets of Sweden, Britain and the Dutch Republic sailed into the Øresund, and, since they severely outnumbered the Danish fleet (61 ships of the line against 21), prevented the Danish fleet from interdicting the Swedish troop transports.  Under the cover of these combined fleets, Charles XII of Sweden put troops ashore and bombarded Copenhagen, thus ending the early Danish participation in the Great Northern War. 

By 1709, when the war resumed, Gyldenløve had risen in the organization. Under his command, late in the autumn of 1712 the North Squadron joined with the Baltic fleet. Lord High Admiral Gyldenløve had gathered the fleet to support the siege of Stralsund. This fleet attacked the Swedish fleet while they were offloading transports on 29 September; Gyldenløve's fleet fired 80 transport ships, making it impossible for Sweden to relieve Stralsund. This represented a notable victory. The fleet played a continued role in the siege of Stralsund, ultimately resulting in the loss of the city and the flight of Charles XII to Sweden.

Ancestry

References

Sources

 Admiral Thunderbolt, by Hans Christian Adamson, Chilton Company, 1959.
  Dansk biografisk Lexikon / VI. Bind,  by  Carl Frederik Bricka (1887–1905)

18th-century Danish naval officers
Danish admirals
17th-century Danish nobility
18th-century Danish nobility
Illegitimate children of Danish monarchs
17th-century Danish people
18th-century Danish people
People from Samsø Municipality
1678 births
1719 deaths
Sons of kings